The Lower Saxon Department for Water, Coastal and Nature Conservation or NLWKN is a department of the state of Lower Saxony, with its headquarters in Norden (Ostfriesland) and is responsible to the Minister for the Environment and Climate Protection.

Other NLWKN services 

 national flood reporting service in the catchment areas of the Weser, Aller and Leine
 national storm surge warning service for the Lower Saxon coast 
 current water level data (gauge measurements) for the Weser and Ems

External links 

 Website: NLWKN

Organisations based in Lower Saxony
Hydraulic engineering
Coastal engineering
Nature conservation in Germany